Engineering Infinity is a science fiction anthology edited by Jonathan Strahan. It was nominated for a Locus Award for Best Anthology in 2012.

Contents
The anthology includes 15 stories:
 "Beyond the Gernsback Continuum ..." by Jonathan Strahan (Introduction)
 "Malak" by Peter Watts (short story)
 "Watching the Music Dance" by Kristine Kathryn Rusch (short story)
 "Laika's Ghost" (Gennady Malianov series) by Karl Schroeder (novelette)
 "The Invasion of Venus" by Stephen Baxter (short story)
 "The Server and the Dragon" by Hannu Rajaniemi (short story)
 "Bit Rot" (Saturn's Children) by Charles Stross (novelette)
 "Creatures with Wings" by Kathleen Ann Goonan (novelette)
 "Walls of Flesh, Bars of Bone" by Damien Broderick and Barbara Lamar (novelette)
 "Mantis" by Robert Reed (novelette)
 "Judgement Eve" by John C. Wright (novelette)
 "A Soldier of the City" by David Moles (novelette)
 "Mercies" by Gregory Benford (novelette)
 "The Ki-anna" by Gwyneth Jones (novelette)
 The Birds and the Bees and the Gasoline Trees by John Barnes (novella)

Critical reception
Engineering Infinity was nominated for a Locus Award for Best Anthology in 2012.

References

External links
 
 

2010 anthologies
Science fiction anthologies
2010s science fiction works
Solaris Books books